Anton Versluijs (7 March 1893 – 14 October 1982) was a Dutch painter. His work was part of the painting event in the art competition at the 1928 Summer Olympics.

References

1893 births
1982 deaths
20th-century Dutch painters
Dutch male painters
Olympic competitors in art competitions
Painters from Rotterdam
20th-century Dutch male artists